Nicole Hosp (born 6 November 1983) is a former World Cup alpine ski racer from Austria. She competed in all five disciplines and was a world champion, three-time Olympic medalist, and an overall World Cup champion.

Career
Born in Ehenbichl, Tyrol, she won her first World Cup competition, giant slalom, in Sölden, Tyrol, Austria on 26 October 2002, sharing the victory with Andrine Flemmen and Tina Maze. Hosp won the overall World Cup title in 2007 and the season title in giant slalom. A versatile all-around racer, she won World Cup races in four of the five alpine skiing disciplines (super-G, giant slalom, slalom and combined), and was world champion in the giant slalom in 2007. Although Hosp won the giant slalom crystal globe in 2007, she stopped racing GS after often not qualifying for the second run in 2011. In her final seasons, she competed in four disciplines: slalom, Super-G, downhill, and combined.

Hosp suffered an anterior cruciate ligament injury to her right knee at Sölden in October 2009 and missed the rest of the 2010 season, including the 2010 Winter Olympics.

World Cup results

Season titles
2 titles – (1 overall, 1 GS)

Season standings

Race victories
12 wins – (1 SG, 5 GS, 5 SL, 1 SC)
57 podiums – (1 DH, 9 SG, 20 GS, 20 SL, 7 SC)

World Championship results

Olympic results

References

External links
 
 Austrian Ski team – official site – Nicole Hosp – 
Fischer Skis – athletes – Nicole Hosp
  – 

1983 births
Austrian female alpine skiers
Alpine skiers at the 2006 Winter Olympics
Alpine skiers at the 2014 Winter Olympics
Olympic alpine skiers of Austria
Medalists at the 2006 Winter Olympics
Medalists at the 2014 Winter Olympics
Olympic medalists in alpine skiing
Olympic silver medalists for Austria
Olympic bronze medalists for Austria
FIS Alpine Ski World Cup champions
People from Reutte District
Living people
Sportspeople from Tyrol (state)
20th-century Austrian women
21st-century Austrian women